Yevgeni Vyacheslavovich Tochilin (born 7 March 1991) is a former Russian professional football player.

External links
 
 
 Player page by sportbox.ru

1991 births
Footballers from Moscow
Living people
Russian footballers
Association football midfielders
FC Sfîntul Gheorghe players
Moldovan Super Liga players
Russian expatriate footballers
Expatriate footballers in Moldova